The District Council of Rosewater was a local government area of South Australia immediately east of Port Adelaide from 1877 to 1899.

History

The council was abolished in 1899, being the last small neighbour of Port Adelaide to be absorbed into the larger corporate town.

Notes

1877 establishments in Australia
1899 disestablishments in Australia
Rosewater, District Council of